This is a list of earthquakes in 1977. Only earthquakes of magnitude 6 or above are included, unless they result in damage and/or casualties, or are notable for some other reason. Events in remote areas will not be listed but included in statistics and maps. Countries are entered on the lists in order of their status in this particular year. All dates are listed according to UTC time. Maximum intensities are indicated on the Mercalli intensity scale and are sourced from United States Geological Survey (USGS) ShakeMap data. Not a particularly busy year as far as the number of magnitude 7.0+ events with 11 being recorded. The largest event struck Indonesia in August and measured magnitude 8.3. The Solomon Islands were affected by a series of magnitude 7.5 events in April. Several events caused significant numbers of fatalities especially in Iran which had 3 earthquakes throughout the year with a combined death toll of around 1,120 people. The deadliest earthquake occurred in Romania in March and was the worst in the country's history. 1,641 people were killed in this event.

By death toll

Listed are earthquakes with at least 10 dead.

By magnitude

Listed are earthquakes with at least 7.0 magnitude.

By month

January

February

March

April

May

June

July

August

September

October

November

December

References 

1977
1977 earthquakes
1977 natural disasters
1977